Winful Essau Cobbinah (born 6 September 1991) is a Ghanaian professional footballer who plays for Egyptian club Cleopatra, as an attacking midfielder.

Club career
Cobbinah began his career in his native Ghana, playing for Starke Professionals, BT Professionals and Tudu Mighty Jets, before signing for Ghana Premier League club Hearts of Oak in 2012.

In 2014, Cobbinah signed for Saudi Arabian club Najran. Cobbinah later terminated his contract at the club due to unpaid wages.

In 2017, Cobbinah returned to Hearts of Oak. Cobbinah made 25 league appearances, scoring five times in his second spell at the club.

On 13 July 2018, Cobbinah signed for Tirana.

In October 2020, it was revealed that Cobbinah was awarded Albanian citizenship by President Ilir Meta.

On Tuesday November 17, 2020, Newly promoted Egypt Premier League side Ceramica Cleopatra FC  signed Ghanaian midfielder Winful Cobbinah on a free transfer after his contract with Albanian giants KF Tirana ended last month.

International career
After representing Ghana U17 and Ghana U20, Cobbinah made his senior debut for Ghana on 25 May 2017 against Benin. On 16 September 2017, Cobbinah scored his first goal for Ghana, in a 1–0 win against Mali in the 2017 WAFU Cup of Nations.

International goals
Scores and results list Ghana's goal tally first.

Honours
Tirana
 Albanian Superliga: 2019–20

References

1991 births
Living people
Footballers from Accra
Association football midfielders
Ghanaian footballers
Ghana under-20 international footballers
Ghana international footballers
Tudu Mighty Jets FC players
Accra Hearts of Oak S.C. players
Najran SC players
KF Tirana players
Ghana Premier League players
Saudi Professional League players
Kategoria Superiore players
Ghanaian expatriate footballers
Ghanaian expatriate sportspeople in Saudi Arabia
Expatriate footballers in Saudi Arabia
Ghanaian expatriate sportspeople in Albania
Expatriate footballers in Albania